The following is an alphabetical list of articles related to the United States Commonwealth of Pennsylvania.

0–9 
 
.pa.us – Internet second-level domain for the Commonwealth of Pennsylvania
2nd State to ratify the Constitution of the United States of America
30th Street Station 
1st Pennsylvania Infantry Regiment
2nd Pennsylvania Infantry Regiment
4th Pennsylvania Infantry Regiment
11th Pennsylvania Infantry Regiment 
12th Pennsylvania Infantry Regiment 
20th Pennsylvania Infantry Regiment 
23rd Pennsylvania Infantry Regiment
25th Pennsylvania Infantry Regiment
26th Pennsylvania Infantry Regiment
27th Pennsylvania Infantry Regiment
28th Pennsylvania Infantry Regiment
29th Pennsylvania Infantry Regiment
45th Pennsylvania Infantry Regiment
46th Pennsylvania Infantry Regiment
47th Pennsylvania Infantry Regiment 
48th Pennsylvania Infantry Regiment 
49th Pennsylvania Infantry Regiment
50th Pennsylvania Infantry Regiment
51st Pennsylvania Infantry Regiment
52nd Pennsylvania Infantry Regiment
53rd Pennsylvania Infantry Regiment
54th Pennsylvania Infantry Regiment
55th Pennsylvania Infantry Regiment
56th Pennsylvania Infantry Regiment
57th Pennsylvania Infantry Regiment 
58th Pennsylvania Infantry Regiment
61st Pennsylvania Infantry Regiment
62nd Pennsylvania Infantry Regiment
63rd Pennsylvania Infantry Regiment
68th Pennsylvania Infantry Regiment
69th Pennsylvania Infantry Regiment
71st Pennsylvania Infantry Regiment 
72nd Pennsylvania Infantry Regiment
73rd Pennsylvania Infantry Regiment
74th Pennsylvania Infantry Regiment
75th Pennsylvania Infantry Regiment
76th Pennsylvania Infantry Regiment
77th Pennsylvania Infantry Regiment
78th Pennsylvania Infantry Regiment
79th Pennsylvania Infantry Regiment
81st Pennsylvania Infantry Regiment
82nd Pennsylvania Infantry Regiment
83rd Pennsylvania Infantry Regiment
84th Pennsylvania Infantry Regiment
85th Pennsylvania Infantry Regiment
87th Pennsylvania Infantry Regiment
88th Pennsylvania Infantry Regiment
90th Pennsylvania Infantry Regiment
91st Pennsylvania Infantry Regiment
93rd Pennsylvania Infantry Regiment
95th Pennsylvania Infantry Regiment
96th Pennsylvania Infantry Regiment
97th Pennsylvania Infantry Regiment
98th Pennsylvania Infantry Regiment
99th Pennsylvania Infantry Regiment
100th Pennsylvania Infantry Regiment
102nd Pennsylvania Infantry Regiment
105th Pennsylvania Infantry Regiment
106th Pennsylvania Infantry Regiment
107th Pennsylvania Infantry Regiment 
109th Pennsylvania Infantry Regiment
110th Pennsylvania Infantry Regiment
111th Pennsylvania Infantry Regiment 
114th Pennsylvania Infantry Regiment 
115th Pennsylvania Infantry Regiment
116th Pennsylvania Infantry Regiment
118th Pennsylvania Infantry Regiment 
119th Pennsylvania Infantry Regiment
121st Pennsylvania Infantry Regiment
123rd Pennsylvania Infantry Regiment
124th Pennsylvania Infantry Regiment
125th Pennsylvania Infantry Regiment 
126th Pennsylvania Infantry Regiment
127th Pennsylvania Infantry Regiment
128th Pennsylvania Infantry Regiment 
129th Pennsylvania Infantry Regiment 
130th Pennsylvania Infantry Regiment
131st Pennsylvania Infantry Regiment
132nd Pennsylvania Infantry Regiment
133rd Pennsylvania Infantry Regiment
134th Pennsylvania Infantry Regiment
136th Pennsylvania Infantry Regiment
137th Pennsylvania Infantry Regiment
138th Pennsylvania Infantry Regiment
139th Pennsylvania Infantry Regiment
140th Pennsylvania Infantry Regiment
141st Pennsylvania Infantry Regiment
142nd Pennsylvania Infantry Regiment
143rd Pennsylvania Infantry Regiment
145th Pennsylvania Infantry Regiment
147th Pennsylvania Infantry Regiment
148th Pennsylvania Infantry Regiment
149th Pennsylvania Infantry Regiment 
150th Pennsylvania Infantry Regiment
151st Pennsylvania Infantry Regiment 
157th Pennsylvania Infantry Regiment
172nd Pennsylvania Infantry Regiment
183rd Pennsylvania Infantry Regiment
184th Pennsylvania Infantry Regiment
190th Pennsylvania Infantry Regiment
191st Pennsylvania Infantry Regiment
196th Pennsylvania Infantry Regiment
197th Pennsylvania Infantry Regiment
198th Pennsylvania Infantry Regiment
199th Pennsylvania Infantry Regiment
200th Pennsylvania Infantry Regiment
201st Pennsylvania Infantry Regiment
202nd Pennsylvania Infantry Regiment
205th Pennsylvania Infantry Regiment
206th Pennsylvania Infantry Regiment
207th Pennsylvania Infantry Regiment
210th Pennsylvania Infantry Regiment
211th Pennsylvania Infantry Regiment
213th Pennsylvania Infantry Regiment
214th Pennsylvania Infantry Regiment
215th Pennsylvania Infantry Regiment

A
Adjacent states and province:
 (Canada)

Afflerbach, Roy
Agere Systems
Aguilera, Christina
Air Products
Allegheny College
Alburtis 
Alexander, George Warren
Allen, William
Allentown
Allentown Art Museum
Allentown Band
Allentown Central Catholic High School
Allentown culture
Allentown Fairgrounds
Allentown historic places
Allentown Queen City Municipal Airport
"Allentown", the song by Billy Joel
Allentown Symphony Orchestra
All the Right Moves
Altoona
Amato, Chuck
America on Wheels
Amish
Ancient Oaks
Andretti, Jeff
Andretti, John
Andretti, Mario
Andretti, Michael
Andrews, William
Angle, Kurt
Amusement parks in Pennsylvania
Ann, Lisa
Anoa'i Jr., Afa
Aponavicius, Steve
Appalachia
Aquaria in Pennsylvania
commons:Category:Aquaria in Pennsylvania
Arboreta in Pennsylvania
commons:Category:Arboreta in Pennsylvania
:Category:Archaeological sites in Pennsylvania
Archaeological sites on the National Register of Historic Places in Pennsylvania
commons:Category:Archaeological sites in Pennsylvania
Area codes 610, 484, and 835
Art museums and galleries in Pennsylvania
commons:Category:Art museums and galleries in Pennsylvania
Astronomical observatories in Pennsylvania
Avondale Mine Disaster
Avonworth High School

B
Bach Choir of Bethlehem
Bader, David
Barkley, Saquon
Barrett, Stephen 
Bates, Samuel Penniman
Battle of Brandywine
Battle of Carlisle
Battle of Germantown
Battle of Gettysburg
Battle of Hanover
Battle of Hunterstown
Battle of Sporting Hill
Baum School of Art
Bauman, Christian
Bausman, Karen
Bear Creek Mountain Resort
Beaver Falls
Bednarik, Chuck
Behe, Michael
Benet, Stephen Vincent
Berks County
Berninger, John E.
Bethlehem
Bethlehem Catholic High School
Bethlehem Steel
Bicycle routes in Pennsylvania
Bierbauer, Charles
Biery, James Soloman
Biletnikoff, Fred
Bilger's rocks
Biermelin, John
Blackman, Steve
Blank, Clair
Bloomsburg University of Pennsylvania
Blue Mountain
Boehret, Katherine
Booker, Chakaia
Booros, Jim
Botanical gardens in Pennsylvania
commons:Category:Botanical gardens in Pennsylvania
Boyz II Men
Braden Airpark
Brady, Kyle
Braun, Rick
Breaking Benjamin
Briggs, Lillian
Browne, Thom
Bryant, Jen
Bryant, Kobe
Bryn Mawr
Bryn Mawr College
Buchman, Frank
Buckeye Partners
Bucks County
Buesgen, Karl
Buildings and architecture of Allentown, Pennsylvania
Buildings and structures in Pennsylvania
commons:Category:Buildings and structures in Pennsylvania
Burrell, Leroy 
Bustill family 
Bustill, Cyrus 
Bowser, David Bustill
Douglass, Robert Jr.
Douglass, Sarah Mapps
Mossell, Gertrude Bustill
Robeson, Paul
Smith, Anna Bustill 
Butler, Ian "Rocky"

C

Calipari, John
Canyons and gorges of Pennsylvania
commons:Category:Canyons and gorges of Pennsylvania
Capital of the Commonwealth of Pennsylvania
Capitol of the Commonwealth of Pennsylvania
commons:Category:Pennsylvania State Capitol
Cappelletti, John
Carbon County
Carlisle
Carr, Leon
Caruso, Francesco
Casinos in Pennsylvania
Catasauqua
Catasauqua High School
Catasauqua Area School District
Cattell, James McKeen
Caves of Pennsylvania
commons:Category:Caves of Pennsylvania
Cedar Crest Boulevard
Cedar Crest College
Census statistical areas in Pennsylvania
Central Bucks School District
Center City Allentown
Central Dauphin High School
Central High School (Philadelphia)
Centralia
Chamberlain, Wilt
Chando, Alexandra 
Charles Evans Cemetery
Cheltenham High School
Chester
Citizens for Pennsylvania's Future
Civil War
Climate of Pennsylvania
:Category:Climate of Pennsylvania
commons:Category:Climate of Pennsylvania
Coal Region 
Coates, Thomas
Coca-Cola Park
Coleman, Jack
Colleges and universities in Pennsylvania
Colony of Pennsylvania
Commonwealth of Pennsylvania  website
Government of the Commonwealth of Pennsylvania
:Category:Government of Pennsylvania
commons:Category:Government of Pennsylvania
Communications in Pennsylvania
commons:Category:Communications in Pennsylvania
Continental Congress
Convention centers in Pennsylvania
commons:Category:Convention centers in Pennsylvania
Coopersburg
Coplay Cement Company Kilns
Cosmides, Leda
Cosby, Bill
Counties of Pennsylvania
Cowher, Bill
Crater, Joseph Force
Crayola
Culture of Pennsylvania
commons:Category:Pennsylvania culture
Cumberland Valley
Cumberland Valley High School
Cunningham, James B.
William F. Curtis Arboretum

D
Daly, Chuck
Daniel, George
Davenport, Russell
Da Vinci Science Center
Davis, Parke H. 
Dean, John
Declaration of Independence
The Deer Hunter
DeGrasso, Jimmy
Delaware River
Delaware Valley
DeLong, Solomon
Demographics of Pennsylvania
:Category:Demographics of Pennsylvania
Dent, Charlie
DeSales University
Devon
Diehl, Richard
Dieruff High School
Ditka, Mike
Dixon, Don
Doom, Omar
Dorney, Keith
Dorney Park & Wildwater Kingdom
Dorsett, Tony
Dotson, Jahan
Drake, Edwin

E
Eastern Pennsylvania Conference
Easton
Easton Area High School
The Streak (Easton High School Wrestling)
East Penn School District
East Texas
Economy of Pennsylvania
:Category:Economy of Pennsylvania
commons:Category:Economy of Pennsylvania
Education in Pennsylvania
:Category:Education in Pennsylvania
commons:Category:Education in Pennsylvania 
Egle, William Henry
Elections in the State of Pennsylvania
:Category:Pennsylvania elections
commons:Category:Pennsylvania elections
Electric Factory
Ellis School, The
Emmaus
Emmaus High School
Emmerich, Slim
Environment of Pennsylvania
commons:Category:Environment of Pennsylvania
Erie, Pennsylvania
Erie Triangle 
Evans, Charles

F
Farr Building

Fegley, Oakes
Festivals in Pennsylvania
commons:Category:Festivals in Pennsylvania
Films and television shows set or shot in Pennsylvania
Flag of the Commonwealth of Pennsylvania
Flashdance (film)
Flynn, Michael
Fogelsville
Follett Ice
Forts in Pennsylvania
:Category:Forts in Pennsylvania
commons:Category:Forts in Pennsylvania
Fox Learning Systems
Frakes, Jonathan
Franklin, Benjamin
Freedom High School
Freeman, Buck
Fuel (band)

G

Geography of Pennsylvania
:Category:Geography of Pennsylvania
commons:Category:Geography of Pennsylvania
Geology of Pennsylvania
:Category:Geology of Pennsylvania
commons:Category:Geology of Pennsylvania
George School
Gerlach, Charles L.
Gernerd, Fred Benjamin
Gettysburg
Gettysburg Address
Gettysburg Campaign
Gettysburg National Cemetery
Gettysburg College
Ghost towns in Pennsylvania
:Category:Ghost towns in Pennsylvania
commons:Category:Ghost towns in Pennsylvania
Giobbi, Matthew 
Gifford Pinchot State Park
Glazier, Rick
Gobin, John Peter Shindel
Golf clubs and courses in Pennsylvania
Goodman, Murray H.
Government of the Commonwealth of Pennsylvania  website
:Category:Government of Pennsylvania
commons:Category:Government of Pennsylvania
Governor of the Commonwealth of Pennsylvania
governors
Grace, Eugene
Gray, Aaron
Great Allentown Fair 
Grey Towers National Historic Site
Griffey, Ken Jr.
Griffey, Ken Sr.
Great Seal of the Commonwealth of Pennsylvania
Groller, Walt
Gross, Peter Alfred

H
Hall & Oates
Hamilton, Richard
Harris, Mel
Harrisburg, Pennsylvania, state capital since 1812
Harrisburg Academy
Harrisburg Area Community College
Harrisburg City Islanders
Harrisburg International Airport
Harrisburg Senators
Harrisburg State Hospital
Harrisburg University of Science and Technology
Harrison, Marvin
Hart, Terry
Hassler, Alfred
Hazard, Erskine
Hazleton
H.D.
Heffner, Bob
Heidecker, Tim
Hensingersville
Henley, Althea
Hergesheimer, Ella Sophonisba
Heritage railroads in Pennsylvania
commons:Category:Heritage railroads in Pennsylvania
Hershey
Hersheypark
Hess, David
Hess's
High German Evangelical Reformed Church
High schools in Pennsylvania
Highway routes in Pennsylvania
Hiking trails in Pennsylvania
commons:Category:Hiking trails in Pennsylvania
History of Pennsylvania
Historical outline of Pennsylvania
:Category:History of Pennsylvania
commons:Category:History of Pennsylvania 
Hodge, Ruth E.
Holmes, Larry
Horton, Frank Reed
Hospitals in Pennsylvania
Hostetler, Jeff
Hrab, George

I
Iacocca, Lee
Images of Pennsylvania
commons:Category:Pennsylvania
Independence Hall
Indiana University of Pennsylvania
Interstate highway routes in Pennsylvania
Interstate 476
Interstate 76
Interstate 78
Interstate 95
Islands of Pennsylvania

J
Jacob Ehrenhardt Jr. House
Jarrett, Keith
Jim Thorpe, Pennsylvania
Johns, Michael
Johnson, Dwayne
Johnstown
Juniata College
Just Born

K
Keller, Tim
Kelly, Grace
Kelly, Jim
Kemmerer House
Kennywood
Kidman, Billy
Kim, Daniel Dae
Kimock, Steve
Kirkland, Gelsey
Kline, John
Kline, Marcus C. L.
Knauss, Sarah
Knobbs, Brian
Knoebels
Knorr, Nathan Homer
Kolber, Suzy
Koppen, Dan
Kressley, Carson
Kutztown
Kutztown University of Pennsylvania
Kecksburg

L
Lafayette College
Lafayette Leopards
Lafayette Leopards football
Lafayette Leopards men's basketball
Lafayette Leopards men's lacrosse
Lafayette Leopards women's basketball
Lakes of Pennsylvania
Lake Erie
Lake Muhlenberg
commons:Category:Lakes of Pennsylvania
LaMontagne, Noel
Lancaster
Landmarks in Pennsylvania
commons:Category:Landmarks in Pennsylvania
Lehigh and Northampton Transportation Authority
Laurel Highlands
Lavelle, Gary
Lebanon
Lehigh Canal
Lehigh County historic places
Lehigh County Historical Society
Lehigh Parkway
Lehigh River
Lehigh Street
Lehigh University
Goodman Stadium
Lehigh Mountain Hawks
Lehigh Mountain Hawks football
Lehigh Mountain Hawks men's basketball
Lehigh Mountain Hawks men's lacrosse
Lehigh Mountain Hawks women's basketball
Lehigh Valley
Lehigh Valley AVA
Lehigh Valley College
Lehigh Valley Conference
Lehigh Valley Health Network
Lehigh Valley Hospital–Cedar Crest
Lehigh Valley International Airport
Lehigh Valley IronPigs
Lehigh Valley Outlawz
Lehigh Valley Mall
Lehigh Valley media
Lehigh Valley Phantoms
Lehigh Valley Roller Derby
Lehigh Valley Zoo
Leonard, Herman
Lepchenko, Varvara
Ley, Christian
Liberty Bell Museum
Lenel, Ludwig
Lennertz, Christopher
Lewis, Fred Ewing
Liberty Bell
Liberty High School
Lichtenwalner, Norton Lewis
Lil Peep
Lindenmuth, Arlington Nelson
Lipton, Jonathan
Lists related to the Commonwealth of Pennsylvania:
List of airports in Pennsylvania
List of bicycle routes in Pennsylvania
List of cathedrals in Pennsylvania
List of census statistical areas in Pennsylvania
List of cities in Pennsylvania
List of colleges and universities in Pennsylvania
List of United States congressional districts in Pennsylvania
List of counties in Pennsylvania
List of dams and reservoirs in Pennsylvania
List of films and television shows set or shot in Pennsylvania
List of films shot in Pittsburgh
List of films shot in the Lehigh Valley
List of forts in Pennsylvania
List of ghost towns in Pennsylvania
List of governors of Pennsylvania
List of high schools in Pennsylvania
List of highway routes in Pennsylvania
List of hospitals in Pennsylvania
List of individuals executed in Pennsylvania
List of Interstate highway routes in Pennsylvania
List of islands of Pennsylvania
List of lakes in Pennsylvania
List of law enforcement agencies in Pennsylvania
List of mayors of Allentown
List of mayors of Harrisburg
List of mayors of Philadelphia
List of mayors of Pittsburgh
List of museums in Pennsylvania
List of National Historic Landmarks in Pennsylvania
List of newspapers in Pennsylvania
List of parking authorities in Pennsylvania
List of Pennsylvania firsts
List of people from Erie, Pennsylvania
List of people from Lancaster County, Pennsylvania
List of people from Pennsylvania
List of people from Philadelphia
List of people from the Lehigh Valley
List of people from Pittsburgh
List of places in Pennsylvania
List of power stations in Pennsylvania
List of radio stations in Pennsylvania
List of railroads in Pennsylvania
List of Registered Historic Places in Pennsylvania
List of rivers of Pennsylvania
List of school districts in Pennsylvania
List of sister cities in Pennsylvania
List of state and county courthouses in Pennsylvania
List of state forests in Pennsylvania
List of Pennsylvania weather records
List of state highway routes in Pennsylvania
List of state parks in Pennsylvania
List of state prisons in Pennsylvania
List of symbols of the State of Pennsylvania
List of television stations in Pennsylvania
List of the largest cities in Pennsylvania (Population)
List of United States congressional delegations from Pennsylvania
List of United States congressional districts in Pennsylvania
List of United States representatives from Pennsylvania
List of United States senators from Pennsylvania
Littlestown Area School District
Litz, Thomas
Live
Lost Children of the Alleghenies
Lower Macungie Township

M
Machado, Carmen Maria
Mack Trucks
Macungie
Malvern Preparatory School
Maps of Pennsylvania
commons:Category:Maps of Pennsylvania
March, Francis
Marchant, William
Marciniak, Michelle M.
Marino, Dan
Martin Guitar
Martin, Tyrese
Mauch Chunk Switchback Railway
Mayfair Festival of the Arts
McCaffrey, Ed
McDonald, Michael
McGlade, John E.
McMenamy, Kristen
Meister, John
Meyers, Albertus L.
Micuccui, Kate
Midgley, Thomas Jr.
Milinichik, Joe
Millen, Matt
Miller, Lara Jill 
Miller, Lucy Kennedy
Miller, Mulgrew
Miller Symphony Hall
Milton Hershey School
Montgomery County 
Montgomery, Morton L.
Montana, Joe
Monuments and memorials in Pennsylvania
commons:Category:Monuments and memorials in Pennsylvania
Moravian Academy
Moravian University
The (Allentown) Morning Call
Mountains of Pennsylvania
commons:Category:Mountains of Pennsylvania
Muhlenberg College
Mulholland, Terry
Mullins, Aimee
Munroe, Randall
Museums in Pennsylvania
:Category:Museums in Pennsylvania
commons:Category:Museums in Pennsylvania
Music of Pennsylvania
commons:Category:Music of Pennsylvania
Musikfest
Mutis, Jeff

N
Namath, Joe
National Forests of Pennsylvania
commons:Category:National Forests of Pennsylvania
Natural history of Pennsylvania
commons:Category:Natural history of Pennsylvania
National Museum of Industrial History
Nature centers in Pennsylvania
commons:Category:Nature centers in Pennsylvania
Nazareth
The Weight
Neward, Peter
New Hope, Pennsylvania
New York-Newark-Bridgeport, NY-NJ-CT-PA Combined Statistical Area
New York-Northern New Jersey-Long Island, NY-NJ-PA Metropolitan Statistical Area
Ng, Irene
Nineteenth Street Theater
Northern Lehigh High School
Northampton
Northern Tier
Northampton County historic places 
Northumberland County Historical Society
Northwestern Lehigh School District
Northwest Region
Northstein, Marty
Novack, Sandra

O
O'Connell, Aaron D.
Ohio River
Old Zionsville
Olson, Alix
Olympus Corporation
OraSure Technologies 
Outdoor sculptures in Pennsylvania
commons:Category:Outdoor sculptures in Pennsylvania

P
PA – United States Postal Service postal code for the Commonwealth of Pennsylvania
Packer, Billy
Palmer Park Mall
Parkenfarker, Farley
Parkettes National Gymnastics Training Center
Parkland High School
Penn Central
Penn State Lehigh Valley
Pennsyltucky
Pennsylvania  
Pennsylvania Canal (Delaware Division)
:Category:Pennsylvania
commons:Category:Pennsylvania
commons:Category:Maps of Pennsylvania
Pennsylvania Conference for Women
Pennsylvania Dutch
Pennsylvania Dutch Candies
Pennsylvania Dutch Country
Pennsylvania Fair Trade Coalition
Pennsylvania firsts 
Pennsylvania Heritage Foundation
Pennsylvania Leadership Charter School
Pennsylvania Metropolitan and Micropolitan Statistical Areas
Pennsylvania Provincial Conference
Pennsylvania Railroad
Pennsylvania Renewable Energy and Sustainable Living Festival
Pennsylvania Route 309
Pennsylvania Shakespeare Festival
Pennsylvania State Capitol
Pennsylvania State Game Lands Number 12
Pennsylvania State Game Lands Number 115
Pennsylvania State Police
Pennsylvania state prisons
Pennsylvania State University
Penn State Lehigh Valley
Pennsylvania Turnpike
Penn, William
People from Pennsylvania
:Category:People from Pennsylvania
commons:Category:People from Pennsylvania
:Category:People by city in Pennsylvania
:Category:People from Pennsylvania by occupation
Philadelphia campaign
Philadelphia, colonial capital 1682–1776, state capital 1776–1799, national capital 1776, 1777, 1778–1783, and 1790–1800
Comcast SportsNet (Philadelphia all-sports television network)
KYW (Philadelphia CBS television affiliate)
Philadelphia City Council
Philadelphia City Hall
Philadelphia Flyers
Philadelphia 76ers
Wachovia Center
Philadelphia International Airport
Philadelphia Museum of Art
Philadelphia National Constitution Center
Philadelphia Eagles
Lincoln Financial Field
Philadelphia Phillies
Citizens Bank Park
Philadelphia Soul
WCAU (Philadelphia NBC television affiliate)
WIP-FM (Philadelphia sports talk radio station)
WMGK (Philadelphia classic rock radio station)
WMMR (Philadelphia rock radio station)
WPVI (Philadelphia ABC television affiliate)
WTEL (Philadelphia sports talk radio station)
WTXF (Philadelphia Fox television affiliate)
Philadelphia (film)
Philadelphia-Camden-Vineland, PA-NJ-DE-MD Combined Statistical Area
Philadelphia-Camden-Wilmington, PA-NJ-DE-MD Metropolitan Statistical Area
The Philadelphia Story 
Pierce, Tillie
Pinchot, Cornelia Bryce 
Pinchot, Gifford
Pink
Pittsburgh
Pittsburgh International Airport
Pittsburgh Penguins
Pittsburgh Pirates
Pittsburgh Steelers
Pocalyko, Michael
The Poconos
Camelback Mountain Resort
Camelbeach Waterpark
Politics of Pennsylvania
:Category:Politics of Pennsylvania
commons:Category:Politics of Pennsylvania
Portnoy, Mike
Port of Philadelphia
Powder Valley
PPL Corporation
Promenade Shops at Saucon Valley
Protected areas of Pennsylvania
commons:Category:Protected areas of Pennsylvania 
Proud, Robert

Q
 Quakertown
 Queen
 Quinn, Margeurite
 Quinn, Roman

R
Railroad museums in Pennsylvania
commons:Category:Railroad museums in Pennsylvania
Raphael, Sally Jessy
Reading
Reading Artillerists
Reading Phillies
Reed, Andre
Reeder, Andrew Horatio
Religion in Pennsylvania
:Category:Religion in Pennsylvania
commons:Category:Religion in Pennsylvania
Rey, Zach
Reznor, Trent
Riccaboni, Ian
Riddle, Matt
Ritter, Donald L.
Ritter, James
Roberto Clemente Charter School
Robinson, Harvey Miguel
Rocky
Rock, The
Rodale, Inc.
Men's Health
Runner's World magazine
Roebuck, Daniel
Roller coasters in Pennsylvania
commons:Category:Roller coasters in Pennsylvania
Rolling Rock

S
Sachs, Eddie
Sags, Jerry
Saint Joseph's University
Saint Tikhon's Orthodox Theological Seminary
Salemme, Antonio
Salisbury High School
Santorum, Senator Rick
Saucon Valley Country Club
Schaffer, Jimmie
Schenley High School
Schneck, Dave
Schneider, Brian
Scholastic Scrimmage
School districts in Pennsylvania
Schuyler, Thom
Schuylkill County
Schuylkill Haven
Schuylkill River
Schwab, Charles M.
Scouting in Pennsylvania
Scranton family
Scranton, George Whitfield
Scranton, Joseph A.
Scranton, Marion Margery 
Scranton, William III
Scranton, William Walker
Scranton, William Warren
Scranton, Worthington
Scranton 
Scranton Area Community Foundation
Scranton/Wilkes-Barre Red Barons
Seiple, Larry
Settlements in Pennsylvania
Cities in Pennsylvania
Towns in Pennsylvania
Townships in Pennsylvania
Census Designated Places in Pennsylvania
Other unincorporated communities in Pennsylvania
List of ghost towns in Pennsylvania
List of places in Pennsylvania
Seyfried, Amanda
Shadow Gallery
Shapiro, Beth
Shelter House
Shimerville
Shippensburg University of Pennsylvania
Shore, Marci
Sigmund
Simcox, Grover
Simmons, Curt
Singmaster, Elsie
Sitgreaves, Samuel
The Sixth Sense
Ski areas and resorts in Pennsylvania
commons:Category:Ski areas and resorts in Pennsylvania
Slatington
Smith, Gary Mark 
Smith, Eliza Kennedy
Smith, Will
Snelling, Richard A.
Snelling, Walter O.
Snyder, Dana
Solar power in Pennsylvania
South Central Pennsylvania
South Mall
South Mountain
Spagnola, John
Specter, Senator Arlen
Sports in Pennsylvania
:Category:Sports in Pennsylvania
commons:Category:Sports in Pennsylvania
:Category:Sports venues in Pennsylvania
commons:Category:Sports venues in Pennsylvania
Stabler Arena
State College
State highway routes in Pennsylvania
State of Pennsylvania – see: Commonwealth of Pennsylvania
State Police of Pennsylvania
Stewart, Jimmy
Stewart, Tony
Stirner, Karl
St. Luke's University Health Network
Stone, Sharon
Storm, Jennifer
Strohmeyer, Sarah
Structures in Pennsylvania
commons:Category:Buildings and structures in Pennsylvania
Superfund sites in Pennsylvania
Susquehanna River
Symbols of the Commonwealth of Pennsylvania
:Category:Symbols of Pennsylvania
commons:Category:Symbols of Pennsylvania

T
Tamaqua
Tantaros, Andrea
Taylor Allderdice High School
Taylor, Christine
Taylor, George
Telecommunications in Pennsylvania
commons:Category:Communications in Pennsylvania
Temple University
The Express-Times
The Morning Call
The Promenade Shops at Saucon Valley
The Rivalry
Tokita, Ryo
Tran, Theo
Theatres in Pennsylvania
commons:Category:Theatres in Pennsylvania
30th Street Station, Philadelphia
Thomas, Jonathan Taylor
Tourism in Pennsylvania  website
commons:Category:Tourism in Pennsylvania
Transportation in Pennsylvania
:Category:Transportation in Pennsylvania
commons:Category:Transport in Pennsylvania
Trexler Nature Preserve

U
Unisys
Unitas, Johnny
United States Constitution
United States Mint
United States of America
States of the United States of America
United States census statistical areas of Pennsylvania
United States congressional delegations from Pennsylvania
United States congressional districts in Pennsylvania
United States Court of Appeals for the Third Circuit
United States District Court for the Eastern District of Pennsylvania
United States District Court for the Middle District of Pennsylvania
United States District Court for the Western District of Pennsylvania
United States representatives from Pennsylvania
United States senators from Pennsylvania
University of Pennsylvania
 Annenberg School for Communication
 Graduate School of Education    
 Perelman School of Medicine     
 School of Dental Medicine                
 School of Design                 
 School of Engineering and Applied Science
 School of Nursing  
 School of Social Policy and Practice                 
 School of Veterinary Medicine  
 Wharton School of the University of Pennsylvania
Upper Darby High School
Upper Dublin High School
Upper Macungie Township
Upper Milford Township
US-PA – ISO 3166-2:US region code for the Commonwealth of Pennsylvania
U.S. Route 22 in Pennsylvania

V
Vallejo, Boris
Valley Forge
Valley Forge Military Academy and College
Valley Preferred Cycling Center
VanFleet, Melissa
Van Horne, Dave
Van Kuren, Cheryl
Vera Cruz
Victaulic
Villanova University
Voorhees, Donald

W
WAEB (AM)
WAEB-FM
Wales, Orlando Gray
Walking Purchase
Water parks in Pennsylvania
Waterfalls of Pennsylvania
commons:Category:Waterfalls of Pennsylvania
WCTO
Weaver, Bobby
Weidner, Brant
Weisberger, Lauren
Weiss, Bob
Werley, Cindy
Wescosville
West Chester
West Chester University of Pennsylvania
Westgate Mall
Western Pennsylvania
WFMZ-TV 
Wheeler, Richard ("Dick")
Whitehall High School
Whitehall Mall
White, Jordan
White, Josiah
White, Kevin
White, Kyzir
Wikimedia
Wikimedia Commons:Category:Pennsylvania
commons:Category:Maps of Pennsylvania
Wikinews:Category:Pennsylvania
Wikinews:Portal:Pennsylvania
Wikipedia Category:Pennsylvania
Wikipedia Portal:Pennsylvania
Wikipedia:WikiProject Pennsylvania
:Category:WikiProject Pennsylvania articles
Wikipedia:WikiProject Pennsylvania#Participants
Wikoff, Charles A.
Wild, Susan
Wilkes-Barre
William Allen High School
Williams, Andre
Williamsport
Wind Creek Bethlehem
Wind power in Pennsylvania
WIP-FM
WLVT-TV
WMMR
WMUH
Wolf, Joe
Woodling, Stephanie
WZZO

X

Y
Yeisley, Jason
Yochum, Dan
Yocco's Hot Dogs
York
The York Water Company

Z
Zionsville
Zippel, David
Zirinsky, Walt
Zoellner Arts Center
Zoos in Pennsylvania
commons:Category:Zoos in Pennsylvania

See also

Topic overview:
Pennsylvania
Outline of Pennsylvania

Pennsylvania
 
Pennsylvania